Mathieu Puig (born May 22, 1978, in Perpignan) is a French former professional footballer who played in Ligue 1 for Toulouse.

References

External links
 

1978 births
Living people
French footballers
Ligue 1 players
Ligue 2 players
Toulouse FC players
Angoulême Charente FC players
FC Rouen players
US Boulogne players
Stade Lavallois players
Association football defenders